José Manuel "Josema" Vivancos García (born 1 October 1999) is a Spanish professional footballer who plays as a forward for FC Cartagena B.

Club career
Born in Miranda, Cartagena, Region of Murcia, Vivancos represented EF Santa Ana, CD Juvenia, EF Ciudad Jardín and EF Torre Pacheco as a youth. On 3 July 2018, after finishing his formation, he signed a contract with Villarreal CF and was assigned to the C-team in Tercera División.

Vivancos made his senior debut on 1 September 2018, coming on as a second-half substitute in a 2–0 home win over Elche CF Ilicitano. He scored his first goal on 12 October, netting the opener in a 4–2 home success against CD Acero.

On 6 July 2021, Vivancos joined hometown side FC Cartagena and was assigned to the reserves in Tercera División RFEF. He made his first team debut on 14 November, replacing Mo Dauda late into a 0–2 away loss against Girona FC in the Segunda División.

References

External links

1999 births
Living people
Sportspeople from Cartagena, Spain
Spanish footballers
Footballers from the Region of Murcia
Association football forwards
Segunda División players
Segunda Federación players
Tercera División players
Tercera Federación players
Villarreal CF C players
FC Cartagena B players
FC Cartagena footballers